Calcium fluoride is the inorganic compound of the elements calcium and fluorine with the formula CaF2. It is a white insoluble solid. It occurs as the mineral fluorite (also called fluorspar), which is often deeply coloured owing to impurities.

Chemical structure
The compound crystallizes in a cubic motif called the fluorite structure.

Ca2+ centres are eight-coordinate, being centered in a cube of eight F− centres. Each F− centre is coordinated to four Ca2+ centres in the shape of a tetrahedron. Although perfectly packed crystalline samples are colorless, the mineral is often deeply colored due to the presence of F-centers.
The same crystal structure is found in numerous ionic compounds with formula AB2, such as CeO2, cubic ZrO2, UO2, ThO2, and PuO2. In the corresponding anti-structure, called the antifluorite structure, anions and cations are swapped, such as Be2C.

Gas phase
The gas phase is noteworthy for failing the predictions of VSEPR theory; the  molecule is not linear like , but bent with a bond angle of approximately 145°; the strontium and barium dihalides also have a bent geometry. It has been proposed that this is due to the fluoride ligands interacting with the electron core or the d-subshell of the calcium atom.

Preparation
The mineral fluorite is abundant, widespread, and mainly of interest as a precursor to HF. Thus, little motivation exists for the industrial production of CaF2. High purity CaF2 is produced by treating calcium carbonate with hydrofluoric acid:
CaCO3 + 2 HF → CaF2 + CO2 + H2O

Applications

Naturally occurring CaF2 is the principal source of hydrogen fluoride, a commodity chemical used to produce a wide range of materials.
Calcium fluoride in the fluorite state is of significant commercial importance as a fluoride source. Hydrogen fluoride is liberated from the mineral by the action of concentrated sulfuric acid:
CaF2 + H2SO4 → CaSO4(solid) + 2 HF

Others
Calcium fluoride is used to manufacture optical components such as windows and lenses, used in thermal imaging systems, spectroscopy, telescopes, and excimer lasers (used for photolithography in the form of a fused lens). It is transparent over a broad range from ultraviolet (UV) to infrared (IR) frequencies. Its low refractive index reduces the need for anti-reflection coatings. Its insolubility in water is convenient as well. It also allows much smaller wavelengths to pass through.

Doped calcium fluoride, like natural fluorite, exhibits thermoluminescence and is used in thermoluminescent dosimeters. It forms when fluorine combines with calcium.

Safety
CaF2 is classified as "not dangerous", although reacting it with sulfuric acid produces very toxic hydrofluoric acid. With regards to inhalation, the NIOSH-recommended concentration of fluorine-containing dusts is 2.5 mg/m3 in air.

See also
List of laser types
Photolithography
Skeletal fluorosis

References

External links
NIST webbook thermochemistry data
Charles Townes on the history of lasers
National Pollutant Inventory - Fluoride and compounds fact sheet
Crystran Material Data
MSDS (University of Oxford)

Calcium compounds
Crystals
Fluorides
Fluorite
Alkaline earth metal halides
Optical materials
Fluorite crystal structure